E is a letter of related and vertically oriented alphabets used to write Mongolic and Tungusic languages.

Mongolian language 

Transliterated into Cyrillic with the letter .
 Medial and final forms may be distinguished from those of other tooth-shaped letters through: vowel harmony and its effect on the shape of a word's consonants ( and ), or position in syllable sequence.
  = a traditional initial form.
 Derived from Old Uyghur aleph.
 Produced with  using the Windows Mongolian keyboard layout.
 In the Mongolian Unicode block,  comes after  and before .

Ee 

Transliterated into Cyrillic with the letter .
 Ultimately derived from Old Uyghur bet.
 Produced with  using the Windows Mongolian keyboard layout.
 In the Mongolian Unicode block,  comes after  and before .

Notes

References 

Articles containing Mongolian script text
Mongolic letters
Mongolic languages
Tungusic languages